House of the Wolf or The House of the Wolf may refer to:

 The House of the Wolf, an 1890 novel by Stanley J. Weyman
 House of the Wolf, a 1981 novel by M. K. Wren
 The House of the Wolf, a 1983 novel by Basil Copper
 House of the Wolf, a 2010 novel by Ezzat el Kamhawi

See also
 The House of the Wolfings, an 1889 novel by William Morris
 Het Huis van de Wolf, a 1983 novel by Wim Gijsen released in English as The House of the Wolf
 House of the Wolf Man, a 2009 horror film